Kuriosester Buchtitel des Jahres is a literary prize of Germany. It awards strange titles, not quality of books.

Winners
2010 The Hitman's Guide to Housecleaning by Hallgrímur Helgason, the German title is Zehn Tipps, das Morden zu beenden und mit dem Abwasch zu beginnen. 

German literary awards